James Barr Ames (June 22, 1846 – January 8, 1910) was an American law educator, who popularized the "case-study" method of teaching law.

Biography
Ames was born in Boston, Massachusetts on June 22, 1846; son of Samuel T. and Mary H. (Barr) Ames and grandson of James Barr, M.D. He received his primary education in Boston, then graduated from Harvard College in 1868 (A.B.), and graduated from Harvard Law School in 1872 (LL.B). He began working as a tutor and instructor at Harvard in 1871, and continued until 1873, when he was admitted to the bar. Although a licensed lawyer, Ames did not open a private practice, spending his full-time at Harvard during his entire career, as tutor (French and German, 1871-72), instructor (History, 1872-73), assistant professor (Law, 1873-1877), full professor (Law, 1877-1895), and dean of the Law School (1895-1910).

Ames married Sarah Russell (born September 22, 1851) on June 28, 1880.

He died in Wilton, New Hampshire on January 8, 1910.

Harvard legal career
Ames has been called the foremost teacher of law of his time, being not only an exceptionally broad and accurate scholar, and a profound student of the history of common law, but also having special ability in the development of clear and exact thought in those under his instruction.

In teaching law to his Harvard students, Ames used actual legal cases to illustrate legal principles, a concept which had been developed by Christopher Columbus Langdell. Ames insisted that legal education should require the study of actual cases instead of abstract principles of law. He was instrumental in introducing the case method in the teaching of law, a method which had come into general use in US law schools at the time of his death, and which continues to the present. He was elected a Fellow of the American Academy of Arts and Sciences in 1878. He was a manager of the 1907-founded Comparative Law Bureau of the American Bar Association, whose Annual Bulletin was the first comparative law journal in the U.S.
Ames had received the degree of LL.D. from six universities by the time of his passing.

References

Further reading
Kull, Andrew.  James Barr Ames and the Early Modern History of Unjust Enrichment.  25 Oxford Journal of Legal Studies 297 (2005)
Ames, James Barr. Lectures on Legal History (1913)

External links

www.law.harvard.edu/news/spotlight/classroom/related/hls-deans.html

1846 births
1910 deaths
Deans of Harvard Law School
Harvard Law School faculty
Fellows of the American Academy of Arts and Sciences
Harvard Law School alumni
Harvard College alumni